Omadhoo may refer to:

 Omadhoo (Alif Dhaal Atoll)
 Omadhoo (Thaa Atoll)